This Book Is Broken is a book written by Eye Weekly editor Stuart Berman about the Toronto indie rock band Broken Social Scene, from its inception to its critical acclaim.

References

2009 non-fiction books
Books about rock musicians